Chimole is a dish common in Yucatán, Mexico and Belize and is also known as "Black Dinner" because of its dark appearance. Ingredients include spices and some black recado (achiote paste, a blend of spices commonly used in Maya cuisine) in block pieces. This dish was first known by Yucatec Maya, but because of the Belize's vast cultural diversity, most Belizeans are making it in their homes and for special occasions.

Recipe

Ingredients
1 chicken (cut into pieces)
2 tomatoes (diced)
1/2 onion (sliced)
1/2 sweet pepper (sliced)
1/2 block of black recado 
1/4 cup complete seasoning
1 tsp oregano
Salt and pepper
6 boiled eggs (for serve)
corn tortillas or rice (for serve)

References

Moreno, W. (n.d.). Platinum International Real Estate and Investments - Belize Division.: Chimole a very popular soup in Belize. Platinum International Real Estate and Investments - Belize Division.: Chimole a Very Popular Soup in Belize. Retrieved from http://platinumhomesbelize.blogspot.com/2011/11/chimole-very-popular-soup-in-belize.html
Chimole Recipe. (n.d.). Calories in Chimole. Retrieved from https://web.archive.org/web/20131227101559/http://caloriecount.about.com/chimole-recipe-r351789

Cuisine of Yucatán
Belizean cuisine